Mauritius Shipping Corporation Ltd. (MSCL) is a small cargo-passenger ship company operating on routes to and from Mauritius to Rodrigues and occasionally to Agaléga.

It operates one cargo-passenger ship and a chartered bulk carrier:

References 

Homepage of MSCL

Transport companies established in 1986
Shipping companies of Mauritius
1986 establishments in Mauritius
Companies based in Port Louis